The borate oxalates are chemical compounds containing borate and oxalate anions. Where the oxalate group is bound to the borate via oxygen, a more condensed anion is formed that balances less cations. These can be termed boro-oxalates, bis(oxalato)borates, or oxalatoborates or oxalate borates. The oxalatoborates are heterocyclic compounds with a ring containing -O-B-O-. Bis(oxalato)borates are spiro compounds with rings joined at the boron atom.

Oxalatoborates are used or for research in lithium-ion battery electrolytes and for supercapacitors.

Production
Oxalatoborates have been produced by heating boric acid, oxalic acid and one of a metal oxalate, a metal carbonate or an amine in boiling benzene.

Properties 
When heated, oxalaotoborates decompose at around 320 °C to yield a metaborate, carbon monoxide, and carbon dioxide.

List

References

Borates
Oxalates